Cecep Supriatna is a former Indonesian footballer. He played as goalkeeper.

Career
Supriatna was one of the senior players in Persib whom he joined in 1994. He was one of the most loyal player for Persib and played most of his career in Persib only moving for one season to Persijatim Solo FC in 2002 before returning in 2004 and going to PSGC Ciamis in 2014. He was the oldest player for Persib during the 2013 Indonesia Super League. He announced that the 2013 Indonesia Super League will be his last season as a professional footballer.  As per 2014, he moved to PSGC Ciamis, a club from lower division.

References

External links
 
 Profile at persib.co.id 

1975 births
Living people
Indonesian footballers
Sundanese people
Association football goalkeepers
Persib Bandung players
Sportspeople from Bandung